Stereo Nova was a Greek electronic music band of the 1990s. It was a pioneer band, the best Greek band according to MTV Europe in 1994, with a lot of fans in Greece.

History
Stereo Nova was formed in the early 1990s  by Kbhta, Michalis Delta. Their first name was Bobby Blast. They changed their name to "Stereo Nova" for the release of their self titled debut. They were later joined by a third member, Antonis Pi, who left the group after the release of "Telson".

StereoNova recorded five albums (StereoNova, Discolata, Asyrmatos Kosmos, Telson, Vitamina Tek), while, soon after their disbanding another disc was released –co-produced with Stamatis Kraounakis (Ofelimo Fortio) and another (studio processed live performances disc) titled S.K.A.Z.I. (Skorpia Kommatia Apo Zontanes Ihografisis – Scattered Tracks From Live Recordings).

On 5 December 2008, 11 years after their disbandment, the band reunited for a performance at a party held by popular Athenian weekly LIFO - "a gift to our old fans and our new friends" as Kbhta stated.

Musical style
Stereo Nova are widely recognized as dance and electronic music pioneers in Greece. Their music blends a wide array of urban and electronic influences. Their poetic and socially conscious lyrics are delivered through a mix of rapping and recital.

Discography

Albums
1992  Στέρεο Νόβα - Stereo Nova (Wipe Out)
1993  Ντισκολάτα - Discolata (FM Records)
1994  Ασύρματος κόσμος - Asirmatos kosmos (Wireless world) (FM Records)
1995  The drone compilation - (FM Records)
1996  Τέλσον – Telson (FM Records)
1997  Βιταμίνα τεκ – Vitamina Tek (FM Records)
1998  Ωφέλιμο φορτίο - Ofelimo fortio (Payload), co-produced with Stamatis Kraounakis (FM Records)
1999 Σκάζη (live) - Skazi (Scattered Tracks From Live Recording) (FM Records)
2000 Μπεστ οφ - Best of (FM Records)
2003 Στέρεο Νόβα  (reissue) - (Tomorrow)
2008 Βικτώρια (best of) - Victoria (SonyBMG)
2018 Ουρανός - Ouranos (Inner Ear Records)

Singles and EPs
1993  Το παζλ στον αέρα - To pazl ston aera (The puzzle in the air) (FM Records)
1994  New life 705 - (FM Records)
1994  Τέκνο (Μόμπιλ) - Techno (Mobil) (FM Records)
1995  Λιγότερο από αυτό - Ligotero apo afto (Less than this) (FM Records)
1996  Μάθημα – Mathima (Lesson) (FM Records)
1997  Ταξίδι στη γη – Taksidi sti gi (Trip to earth)(FM Records)
1998  Νόχι - Nohi (FM Records)

Participations
1995  Act Up-Εν τούτω νίκα - Act up-En toutō nika (Act up-In hoc signo vinces) (FM Records)

See also
Kbhta
Mikael Delta

References
General

Specific

External links
Official
Website of Antonis Pi

Unofficial
Unofficial Myspace Profile
The Movement

Greek electronic music groups